Acourtia nana, the desert holly or dwarf desertpeony, is a North American species of perennial plants in the family Asteraceae. found in the Sonoran Desert. It is found in the Sonoran and Chihuahuan Desert regions of the southwestern United States (Arizona, New Mexico, Texas) and northern Mexico (Chihuahua, Coahuila, Nuevo León, San Luis Potosí, Sonora, Zacatecas).

Flowers, uncommonly seen, have a scent similar to jasmine or violets.

References

Nassauvieae
Flora of the South-Central United States
Plants described in 1849
Flora of the Southwestern United States
Flora of Northeastern Mexico
Flora of Sonora